Saheed Balogun  (sometimes spelled as "Saidi") (born 5 February 1967) is a veteran Nigerian actor, film-maker, director, and producer.

Early life and career
Saheed Balogun was born on the 5th of February, 1967, in Enugu State, South-east Nigeria but hails from Oyo State,  Nigeria where he had his primary, secondary and tertiary education respectively. He graduated from Kwara State Polytechnic.
He began his acting career in 1978, in which he presented his first television program titled "Youth Today" on NTA.
He produced his first film titled City Girl in 1989 but had also been featured, produced and directed several Nigerian films before then.

Personal life
Saheed Balogun was initially married to a nollywood actress, Fathia Balogun but unfortunately they got separated and divorced. He has just two children Khalid and Aliyah Balogun.

Selected filmography
Modupe Temi (Thankful) - The first two cast movie in Africa
Gbogbo Ere (Total profit) - The first three cast movie in west Africa
Third Party - The first ever ankara movie in Africa 
Òfin mósè (2006).
Family on Fire (2011)
Rogbodiyan (2017)
Light In The Dark (2019)
 Don't Get Mad Get Even (2019)
Shadow Parties (2020)
The Therapist (2021)
The Herbert Macaulay Affair (2019)
Light in the Dark (2018), a feature film featuring Angel Unigwe, Joke Silvia, Rita Dominic, among others.

See also
List of Yoruba people

External links

References

Living people
1967 births
Nigerian male film actors
Male actors in Yoruba cinema
Yoruba male actors
20th-century Nigerian male actors
21st-century Nigerian male actors
Male actors from Enugu State
Kwara State University alumni
Yoruba filmmakers
Yoruba-language film directors
Nigerian male television actors
Nigerian film producers
Nigerian film directors
Actors from Oyo State
People from Oyo State
Nigerian television personalities
Nigerian television presenters